Malý Slavkov is a village and municipality in Kežmarok District in the Prešov Region of north Slovakia.

History
First written record is dated from 1251.

Geography
The municipality lies at an elevation of 660 metres and covers an area of 4.989 km² . It has a population of about 950.

References

External links
https://web.archive.org/web/20160803222214/http://malyslavkov.e-obce.sk/

Villages and municipalities in Kežmarok District